Advanced Institute of Modern Management & Technology is a private engineering institution in Barrackpore, West Bengal, India which offers undergraduate(B.Tech.) four-year engineering degree courses in five disciplines. The college is affiliated with Maulana Abul Kalam Azad University of Technology.

Departments
It was established in 2001 and offers admission to five branches:
 computer science and engineering 
 electronics and communication engineering 
 mechanical engineering 
 civil engineering 
 electrical engineering

See also

References

External links
University Grants Commission
National Assessment and Accreditation Council

Engineering colleges in West Bengal
Universities and colleges in North 24 Parganas district
Colleges affiliated to West Bengal University of Technology
Educational institutions established in 2001
2001 establishments in West Bengal